The ambassador of the United Kingdom to Mali is the head of the United Kingdom's diplomatic mission in the Republic of Mali.

History

Mali gained independence from France in 1960. British ambassadors have been resident in Mali only from 1961 until 1965 and since 2012; from 1969 to 2012 the ambassador to Senegal was also accredited to Mali.

The British ambassador to Mali was also accredited to the Republic of Niger until 2020 when a resident Ambassador in Niger was established.

Ambassadors
1961–1964: Martin Le Quesne
1964–1965: John Waterfield
1965–1969: Diplomatic relations severed
1969–2012: Combined with Senegal, see List of ambassadors of the United Kingdom to Senegal
2012–2014: Philip Boyle
2014–2016: Joanne Adamson
2016–2018: Alice Walpole
2018–2020: Catherine "Cat" Evans
2020–2021: Guy Warrington
2021–2023: Barry Lowen

2023–present: Katy Ransome

References

External links
UK and Mali, gov.uk

Mali
 
United Kingdom Ambassadors